Dracula sodiroi is a species of orchid.

sodiroi